Chris Riley (born August 3, 1982 in Endicott, New York) is an American soccer player who currently plays for the GBFC Thunder in the National Premier Soccer League.

References

External links
 Riverhounds player profile

1982 births
Living people
American soccer players
USL League Two players
National Premier Soccer League players
USL Second Division players
Western Mass Pioneers players
Wilmington Hammerheads FC players
Wright State Raiders men's soccer players
Charleston Battery players
Pittsburgh Riverhounds SC players
American soccer coaches
Albany BWP Highlanders players
Soccer players from New York (state)
Association football defenders